Los Chankas CYC (known as Cultural Santa Rosa until 2021) is a professional Peruvian football club, located in the city of Andahuaylas, Apurímac, Peru.

History

Copa Perú
In the 2010 Copa Perú, the club classified to Regional Stage but was eliminated by Alianza Unicachi.

In the 2011 Copa Perú, the club classified to Regional Stage but was eliminated by Franciscano San Román and José María Arguedas.

In the 2013 Copa Perú, the club classified to Regional Stage but was eliminated by Franciscano San Román and Fuerza Minera.

In the 2015 Copa Perú, the club classified to National Stage but was eliminated by Sport Ancash in the Round of 16.

Segunda División
On August 19, 2021, Cultural Santa Rosa changed its name to Los Chankas - CYC. The letters CYC are the initials of late club president Clodoaldo Yñigo Condori who died as a result of complications from COVID-19 in the midst of the COVID-19 pandemic in Peru.

Colours and badge

Honours

Regional
Liga Departamental de Apurímac
Winners (3): 1993, 2011, 2013
Runner-up (3): 1992, 2010, 2015

Liga Provincial de Andahuaylas
Winners (2): 2010, 2015
Runner-up (2): 2013, 2014

Liga Distrital de Talavera
Winners (1): 2013, 2015

See also
List of football clubs in Peru
Peruvian football league system

Football clubs in Peru
Police association football clubs